A constitutional referendum was held in Uruguay on 26 November 1950, The proposed amendments to the constitution were rejected by 99.74% of voters.

Results

References

1950 referendums
1950 in Uruguay
1950
Constitutional referendums in Uruguay
November 1950 events in South America